The Old Richmond Historic District is a neighborhood of historic residential and commercial buildings and national historic district located at Richmond, Wayne County, Indiana. The district encompasses 212 contributing buildings located just east of the East Fork of the Whitewater River, comprising some of the earliest extant buildings in Richmond. It developed between about 1816 and 1925 and includes representative examples of Greek Revival, Italianate, and Gothic Revival style architecture. Located in the district is the separately listed Bethel A.M.E. Church.  Other notable contributing buildings include the William Paul Quinn House (c. 1835), Elijah Coffin House (1845-1847), Henry Davis House (1856), Rankempf Cottage (1855), Hall Town House (1838), Edward Frauman House (1855), and Lydia Pierce Cottage (1858).

The district was added to the National Register of Historic Places in 1974 and expanded in 2003.

See also 
 Starr Historic District
 Richmond Railroad Station Historic District
 Reeveston Place Historic District
 East Main Street-Glen Miller Park Historic District
 Richmond Downtown Historic District

References

External links
 Old Richmond photos and information from Waynet.org

Historic districts on the National Register of Historic Places in Indiana
Italianate architecture in Indiana
Greek Revival architecture in Indiana
Gothic Revival architecture in Indiana
Historic districts in Richmond, Indiana
National Register of Historic Places in Wayne County, Indiana